Anderson Arroyo Córdoba (born 27 September 1999) is a Colombian footballer who plays as either a central defender or a right back for Spanish club Deportivo Alavés, on loan from Premier League club Liverpool.

Club career

Fortaleza CEIF
Born in Quibdó, Arroyo finished his formation with Fortaleza C.E.I.F. He made his senior debut on 19 November 2015, coming on as a late substitute in a 3–1 Categoría Primera B home win over Deportivo Pereira, and appeared in one further match during the year as his team achieved promotion.

Arroyo made 22 appearances during three seasons, and described his time at Fortaleza as "unforgettable".

Liverpool
In February 2018, Arroyo joined Liverpool.

Loan to Mallorca
Immediately after joining Liverpool, Arroyo was loaned to RCD Mallorca on an 18-month deal. He was initially assigned to the B-team in Tercera División, and played in 12 matches for the remainder of the season.

Loan to Gent
For the 2018–19 season, Arroyo was loaned to Belgian club K.A.A. Gent, where he joined fellow Liverpool loanee Taiwo Awoniyi.

Loan to Mladá Boleslav
On 24 September 2019, Arroyo joined Czech club FK Mladá Boleslav on loan for the 2019–20 season.

Loan to Salamanca
Arroyo joined Salamanca on loan for the 2020–21 season.

Loan to Mirandés
On 9 July 2021, Arroyo joined CD Mirandés on loan for the season.

Loan to Alavés
On 9 July 2022, Arroyo joined Deportivo Alavés on a season-long loan, as well as signing a contract extension with Liverpool.

Career statistics

Club

References

External links
 

1999 births
Living people
Colombian footballers
Association football defenders
People from Quibdó
Categoría Primera A players
Fortaleza C.E.I.F. footballers
Liverpool F.C. players
Segunda División B players
Tercera División players
RCD Mallorca B players
Salamanca CF UDS players
CD Mirandés footballers
Belgian Pro League players
K.A.A. Gent players
Czech First League players
FK Mladá Boleslav players
Deportivo Alavés players
Expatriate footballers in Spain
Expatriate footballers in Belgium
Expatriate footballers in the Czech Republic
Colombian expatriate sportspeople in Spain
Colombian expatriate sportspeople in Belgium
Colombian expatriate sportspeople in the Czech Republic
Colombia under-20 international footballers
Colombia youth international footballers
Colombian expatriate footballers
Sportspeople from Chocó Department